Pseudoloricaria laeviuscula is the only species of the monotypic genus Pseudoloricaria, a genus of the family Loricariidae of catfish (order Siluriformes). The phylogenetic position of Pseudoloricaria is uncertain.

This species is endemic to Brazil where it is found in the middle and lower  Amazon basin, including the Negro and Branco Rivers. P. laeviuscula is found over sandy bottoms, in clear waters, in the main flow of rivers, and in neighboring temporary ponds.

Pseudoloricaria laeviuscula reaches a length of  SL. Although reproductive habits are unknown, this species is probably a lip brooder. Sexual dimorphism includes hypertrophied development of the lower lip suggesting that P. laeviuscula is a lip brooder. This species shows derived features such as a reduction in size and number of teeth, premaxillary teeth absent, a circular head shape, and eyes reduced in size without iris operculum.

References

Loricariini
Fish of South America
Fish of Brazil
Fish of the Amazon basin
Endemic fauna of Brazil
Taxa named by Pieter Bleeker
Monotypic ray-finned fish genera